The Renaissance Schaumburg Convention Center Hotel is a hotel located at I-90 and Meacham Road in Schaumburg, Illinois. The 500-room hotel opened its doors in July 2006 and is run by Marriott under their Renaissance brand. The property features a  exhibition hall,  of meeting room space, and a  ballroom, all of which can be divided to provide many configurations.

Construction began on the $156 million facility in July 2004 and took two years to complete. The property is owned by the Village of Schaumburg, who chose John Portman & Associates of Atlanta as the architect and Walsh Construction of Chicago as the general contractor.  The original design also called for an $80 million performing arts center but that portion of the design has been tabled for now.  The convention center hosted its first event, the USA Gymnastics Tumbling & Trampoline National Championships, from July 5–14, 2006. The hotel's first guests checked in on July 17, 2006.

All of the interiors for the hotel and convention center were designed by the Atlanta Office of Hirsch Bedner Associates, the world's largest and leading hospitality interior design firm.

In July 2014, it was the site of the Tumblr-themed fandom convention DashCon, which ended up with a number of issues between the organizers, attendees, and the hotel's staff, including the alleged non-payment of a venue use fee to the hotel.

See also
 List of convention centers in the United States

References

External links 
official website

Convention centers in Illinois
Schaumburg, Illinois
John C. Portman Jr. buildings
Buildings and structures in Cook County, Illinois
Tourist attractions in Cook County, Illinois
Hotels in Illinois